Countess Athena of Monpezat (born Princess Athena of Denmark; born 24 January 2012) is a member of the Danish royal family. She is the younger child and only daughter of Prince Joachim and Princess Marie of Denmark. Athena is currently tenth in the line of succession to the Danish throne.

Biography
Athena was born a princess of Denmark on 24 January 2012 at Rigshospitalet, the Copenhagen University Hospital. When her father met the press following her birth, he joked that the name selected for her could be anything from Jo to Scheherazade. She has two older half-brothers from her father's first marriage, Nikolai and Felix and an older brother, Henrik.

In accordance with Danish royal traditions, her names were not revealed until her christening, which took place on 20 May 2012 at the Møgeltønder Church, where her older brothers Felix and Henrik were also christened. She was named Athena Marguerite Françoise Marie for both of her grandmothers as well as for her mother. Her godparents are her maternal uncles, Gregory Grandet and Edouard Cavallier; Carina Axelsson, the long-term girlfriend of her father's cousin Gustav, Hereditary Prince of Sayn-Wittgenstein-Berleburg; and friends of her parents, Julie Mirabaud, Diego de Lavandeyra and Henriette Steenstrup.

On 11 August 2017, she started school at Sct. Joseph Søstrenes Skole – the same Catholic private school in Ordrup as her brother Henrik. In 2019, when Athena and her family moved to France, she was enrolled at the private school EIB Monceau in the 8th arrondissement of Paris alongside her brother.

Titles and styles
Athena was styled as "Her Highness Princess Athena of Denmark, Countess of Monpezat" from birth until 1 January 2023. In September 2022, Queen Margrethe II decided to strip the descendants of her son Joachim of their princely titles. Since 1 January 2023, she has been known as "Her Excellency Countess Athena of Monpezat". She and her father's three other children maintain their places in the order of succession.

References

External links
 Official website

Danish princesses
House of Monpezat
Royal children
2012 births
Living people
Countesses of Monpezat
Danish people of French descent

de:Joachim von Dänemark#Ehen und Kinder